WYFL (92.5 FM) is a noncommercial radio station broadcasting a religious format. Located near Henderson, North Carolina, United States, it serves the Raleigh-Durham, North Carolina area. The station is owned by Bible Broadcasting Network.

The transmitter and broadcast tower are located about ten miles southeast of Henderson. The FM antenna array is a FM10/8 manufactured by SWR.

History
The station signed on as WHNC-FM in 1948, later becoming WXNC. The letters changed to WYFL on October 3, 1981.

Translators

References

External links

Bible Broadcasting Network website

Bible Broadcasting Network
YFL
Radio stations established in 1948
1948 establishments in North Carolina
YFL